Vriesea simplex is a plant species in the genus Vriesea. This species is native to Trinidad, Colombia, eastern Brazil and Venezuela.

Cultivars
 Vriesea 'Charles W.'
 Vriesea 'Golden Tips'
 Vriesea 'Karamea Tipsy'
 Vriesea 'Maroon Delight'
 Vriesea 'Redtail'
 Vriesea 'Sidewinder'

References

simplex
Flora of South America
Plants described in 1829
Epiphytes
Flora of Trinidad and Tobago